Scopula detentata is a moth of the family Geometridae. It was described by Prout in 1926. It is endemic to Myanmar.

References

Endemic fauna of Myanmar
Moths of Asia
Moths described in 1926
detentata
Taxa named by Louis Beethoven Prout